The Treaty of Saadabad (or the Saadabad Pact) was a non-aggression pact signed by Turkey, Iran, Iraq and Afghanistan on July 8, 1937, and lasted for five years. The treaty was signed in Tehran's Saadabad Palace and was part of an initiative for greater Middle Eastern-Oriental relations spearheaded by King Mohammed Zahir Shah of Afghanistan. Ratifications were exchanged in Tehran on June 25, 1938, and the treaty became effective on the same day. It was registered in League of Nations Treaty Series on July 19, 1938.

In Iraq, the left-leaning Bakr Sidqi military government of 1936–1937 was less Arab nationalist than other Iraqi governments. Sidqi was a Kurd and his prime minister, Hikmat Sulayman, was a Turkmen. They were, therefore, interested in diplomacy with Iraq's eastern, non-Arab neighbours. Turkey sought friendly relations with its neighbours and was still recovering from its defeat in World War I and the costly victory in the Turkish War of Independence.

In 1943, the treaty was automatically extended for a further five years because none of the signatories had renounced it.

Notes

External links
 Text of the treaty
 D. Cameron Watt: "The Saadabad Pact of 8 July 1937"

Treaties concluded in 1937
1937 in Asia
Treaties of Turkey
Treaties of Pahlavi Iran
Treaties of the Kingdom of Iraq
Treaties of the Kingdom of Afghanistan
1937 in Turkey
1937 in Iran
1937 in Iraq
1937 in Afghanistan
Non-aggression pacts
Interwar-period treaties